Mary Webster (March 13, 1935 – January 23, 2017) was an American actress of film and television.

Early life
Born in Chicago, Illinois, Webster was raised in Santa Monica, California, and finished high school there. She studied acting at California's Pasadena Playhouse in its theatre arts program.

Career 
Webster's first film role came in 1957 as the love interest in The Delicate Delinquent, with Jerry Lewis in his first solo film following his Martin and Lewis years. Webster then appeared in The Tin Star, her first foray into the Western genre, carried into many television roles. Webster co-starred in Eighteen and Anxious (1957), and in 1961, she appeared in the science-fiction film  Master of the World with Vincent Price.

Aside from Westerns, Webster appeared in various television shows, including two The Twilight Zone episodes "A Passage for Trumpet" and "Death Ship", both of which starred Jack Klugman.

On Broadway, Webster appeared in Dear Charles (1954). She also made national tours with the companies of The Desperate Hours and Mister Roberts.

Personal life 
Webster retired from acting in the mid-1960s. She moved to Dallas, Texas, and lived there until her death at age 81 on January 23, 2017.

Filmography

Film

Television

References

External links
 
 
 

1935 births
2017 deaths
Actresses from Chicago
American film actresses
American stage actresses
American television actresses
21st-century American women